Dominic Yobe (born 4 August 1986) is a Zambian footballer. His elder brother Donewell is also a professional footballer.

Yobe represented Swedish Örgryte between 2004–2007 before signing with AC Oulu. He helped the team to win promotion to Veikkausliiga. On his first Veikkausliiga season in 2010, Dominic was named team captain. In November 2010 he signed a two-year contract with the reigning champions HJK. Yobe's contract was terminated in March 2011 after he was suspected of being involved in a match fixing scandal along with his brother and several other players. He was convicted to a seven-month suspended sentence for bribery.

References

External links
 AC Oulu Profile
 Veikkausliiga Hall of Fame
 

1986 births
Living people
Zambian footballers
Veikkausliiga players
Allsvenskan players
Zambian expatriate footballers
Expatriate footballers in Finland
Expatriate footballers in Sweden
Örgryte IS players
AC Oulu players
Helsingin Jalkapalloklubi players
Association football midfielders